In computer science, a concurrent data structure is a
particular way of storing and organizing data for access by
multiple computing threads (or processes) on a computer.

Historically, such data structures were used on uniprocessor
machines with operating systems that supported multiple
computing threads (or processes). The term concurrency captured the
multiplexing/interleaving of the threads' operations on the
data by the operating system, even though the processors never
issued two operations that accessed the data simultaneously.

Today, as multiprocessor computer architectures that provide
parallelism become the dominant computing platform (through the
proliferation of multi-core processors), the term has come to
stand mainly for data structures that can be accessed by multiple
threads which may actually access the data simultaneously because
they run on different processors that communicate with one another.
The concurrent data structure (sometimes also called a shared data structure) is usually considered to reside in an abstract storage
environment called shared memory, though this memory may be
physically implemented as either a "tightly coupled" or a
distributed collection of storage modules.

Basic principles

Concurrent data structures, intended for use in
parallel or distributed computing environments, differ from
"sequential" data structures, intended for use on a uni-processor
machine, in several ways. Most notably, in a sequential environment
one specifies the data structure's properties and checks that they
are implemented correctly, by providing safety properties. In
a concurrent environment, the specification must also describe
liveness properties which an implementation must provide.
Safety properties usually state that something bad never happens,
while liveness properties state that something good keeps happening.
These properties can be expressed, for example, using Linear Temporal Logic.

The type of liveness requirements tend to define the data structure.
The method calls can be blocking or non-blocking. Data structures are not
restricted to one type or the other, and can allow combinations
where some method calls are blocking and others are non-blocking
(examples can be found in the Java concurrency software
library).

The safety properties of concurrent data structures must capture their 
behavior given the many possible interleavings of methods
called by different threads. It is quite
intuitive to specify how abstract data structures
behave in a sequential setting in which there are no interleavings.
Therefore, many mainstream approaches for arguing the safety properties of a
concurrent data structure (such as serializability, linearizability, sequential consistency, and
quiescent consistency) specify the structures properties
sequentially, and map its concurrent executions to
a collection of sequential ones. 

To guarantee the safety and liveness properties, concurrent
data structures must typically (though not always) allow threads to
reach consensus as to the results
of their simultaneous data access and modification requests. To
support such agreement, concurrent data structures are implemented
using special primitive synchronization operations (see synchronization primitives)
available on modern multiprocessor machines
that allow multiple threads to reach consensus. This consensus can be achieved in a blocking manner by using locks, or without locks, in which case it is non-blocking. There is a wide body
of theory on the design of concurrent data structures (see
bibliographical references).

Design and implementation

Concurrent data structures are significantly more difficult to design
and to verify as being correct than their sequential counterparts.

The primary source of this additional difficulty is concurrency, exacerbated by the fact that 
threads must be thought of as being completely asynchronous:
they are subject to operating system preemption, page faults,
interrupts, and so on. 

On today's machines, the layout of processors and
memory, the layout of data in memory, the communication load on the
various elements of the multiprocessor architecture all influence performance.
Furthermore, there is a tension  between correctness and performance: algorithmic enhancements that seek to improve performance often make it more difficult to design and verify a correct
data structure implementation.

A key measure for performance is scalability, captured by the speedup of the implementation. Speedup is a measure of how
effectively the application is using the machine it is running
on. On a machine with P processors, the speedup is the ratio of the structures execution time on a single processor to its execution time on P processors.  Ideally, we want linear speedup: we would like to achieve a
speedup of P when using P processors. Data structures whose
speedup grows with P are called scalable. The extent to which one can scale the performance of a concurrent data structure is captured by a formula known as Amdahl's law and 
more refined versions of it such as Gustafson's law.

A key issue with the performance of concurrent data structures is the level of memory contention: the overhead in traffic to and from memory as a
result of multiple threads concurrently attempting to access the same
locations in memory. This issue is most acute with blocking implementations 
in which locks control access to memory.  In order to
acquire a lock, a thread must repeatedly attempt to modify that
location. On a cache-coherent
multiprocessor (one in which processors have
local caches that are updated by hardware to keep them
consistent with the latest values stored) this results in long
waiting times for each attempt to modify the location, and is 
exacerbated by the additional memory traffic associated with
unsuccessful attempts to acquire the lock.

See also
 Java concurrency (JSR 166)
 Java ConcurrentMap

References

Further reading
 Nancy Lynch "Distributed Computing"
 Hagit Attiya and Jennifer Welch "Distributed Computing: Fundamentals, Simulations And Advanced Topics, 2nd Ed"
 Doug Lea, "Concurrent Programming in Java: Design Principles and Patterns"
 Maurice Herlihy and Nir Shavit, "The Art of Multiprocessor Programming"
 Mattson, Sanders, and Massingil "Patterns for Parallel Programming"

External links
 Multithreaded data structures for parallel computing, Part 1 (Designing concurrent data structures) by Arpan Sen
 Multithreaded data structures for parallel computing: Part 2 (Designing concurrent data structures without mutexes) by Arpan Sen
 libcds – C++ library of lock-free containers and safe memory reclamation schema
 Synchrobench – C/C++ and Java libraries and benchmarks of lock-free, lock-based, TM-based and RCU/COW-based data structures.

Distributed data structures